The order polynomial is a polynomial studied in mathematics, in particular in algebraic graph theory and algebraic combinatorics. The order polynomial counts the number of order-preserving maps from a poset to a chain of length . These order-preserving maps were first introduced by Richard P. Stanley while studying ordered structures and partitions as a Ph.D. student at Harvard University in 1971 under the guidance of Gian-Carlo Rota.

Definition 

Let  be a finite poset with  elements denoted , and let  be a chain  elements. A map  is order-preserving if  implies .

Similarly, we can define an order polynomial that counts the number of strictly order-preserving maps , meaning  implies . The number of such maps is the strict order polynomial  .

Both  and  have degree .

Examples  

Letting  be a chain of  elements, we have   and    There is only one linear extension (the identity mapping), and both polynomials have leading term .

Letting  be an antichain of  incomparable elements, we have . Since any bijection  is (strictly) order-preserving, there are  linear extensions, and both polynomials reduce to the leading term .

Reciprocity theorem 

There is a relation between strictly order-preserving maps and order-preserving maps:

In the case that  is a chain, this recovers the negative binomial identity. There are similar results for the chromatic polynomial and Ehrhart polynomial (see below), all special cases of Stanley's general Reciprocity Theorem.

Connections with other counting polynomials

Chromatic polynomial 

The chromatic polynomial counts the number of proper colorings of a finite graph  with  available colors. (Thus, the Hasse diagram of the poset is a subgraph of the oriented graph .) We say  is compatible with  if  is order-preserving. Then we have 

where  runs over all acyclic orientations of G, considered as poset structures.

Order polytope and Ehrhart polynomial 

The order polytope associates a polytope with a partial order. For a poset  with  elements, the order polytope  is the set of order-preserving maps , where  is the ordered unit interval, a continuous chain poset. More geometrically, we may list the elements , and identify any mapping  with the point ; then the order polytope is the set of points  with   if . 

The Ehrhart polynomial counts the number of integer lattice points inside the dilations of a polytope.

Ehrhart showed that this is a rational polynomial of degree  in the variable , provided  has vertices in the lattice.

In fact, the Ehrhart polynomial of an order polytope is equal to the order polynomial of the original poset (with a shifted argument):This is an immediate consequence of the definitions, considering the embedding of the -chain poset .

References

Order theory
Polynomials
Polytopes